Prauserella rugosa is a bacterium from the genus Prauserella which has been isolated from the rumen of cattle.

References

Pseudonocardiales
Bacteria described in 1986